Marcel Neumann (born 5 May 1915, date of death unknown) was a Luxembourgian swimmer. He competed in two events at the 1936 Summer Olympics.

References

1915 births
Year of death missing
Luxembourgian male swimmers
Olympic swimmers of Luxembourg
Swimmers at the 1936 Summer Olympics
Place of birth missing